Glenn Bryce (born 7 June 1991 in Alloa) is a Scottish international 7s rugby union player. He currently plays for the LA Giltinis of Major League Rugby (MLR) in the United States.

Bryce spent two seasons with the Jersey Reds helping them gain promotion to the RFU Championship in 2012 and remained in the league in 2013.

He left Jersey in the summer of 2013 to play for the Doncaster Knights. The Knights also secured promotion to the RFU Championship in 2014.

Bryce left the Knights that summer joining the Glasgow Warriors as part of their Elite Development Programme.

In the 2014–15 season, he helped the Warriors secure a vital draw away to Leinster in the Guinness Pro12 after a healthy half time lead was squandered in the second half.

He is the brother of Scottish rugby union internationalist Kevin Bryce.

It was announced in March 2015 that Bryce would secure a professional contract with the Glasgow Warriors for the season 2015–16 graduating from their academy programme.

After a brief spell at Edinburgh, Bryce then joined the Scotland Sevens setup, helping the side to back-to-back titles at the London leg of the World Sevens Series in 2016 and 2017. A place at the 2018 Commonwealth Games on Australia's Gold Coast followed, as Scotland earned a sixth-place finish.

Bryce resigned with old club Glasgow Warriors back in the Pro14 competition for the 2018-19 season. He extended his contract with the club from the 2019-20 season.

On 31 December 2020, Bryce left Glasgow to travel to the United States to sign with the LA Giltinis in the Major League Rugby competition.

References

External links 
 Glasgow Warriors player biography

1991 births
Living people
Edinburgh Rugby players
Glasgow Warriors players
Jersey Reds players
LA Giltinis players
Male rugby sevens players
Rugby union fullbacks
Rugby union players from Alloa
Scotland international rugby sevens players
Scottish rugby union players